Stefan Krickl (born 7 October 1997) is an Austrian footballer who currently plays for SC Prottes.

References

External links
 
 bundesliga.at profile 
 fanreport.com profile 
 Stefan Krickl at ÖFB

1997 births
Living people
Austrian footballers
SV Schwechat players
Floridsdorfer AC players
Association football midfielders